Jadier Herrera is a Cuban professional boxer.

Professional career

Herrera defeated Mark John Yap of the Philippines on February 26, 2022 for the WBA Asia Super Featherweight title.  On June 18, 2022 Herrera won the WBC International Super Featherweight Title. On November 13, 2022 Herrera defeated Franklin Manzanilla for his first defense of the WBC International Super Featherweight Title.

Professional boxing record

Personal life
Herrera resides in Dubai, United Arab Emirates

Herrera is the grandson of Cuban boxing legend Ángel Herrera Vera.

References

Living people
Year of birth missing (living people)
Cuban male boxers
World Boxing Association  champions
World Boxing Council champions